The Montana Army National Guard is a component of the United States Army and the United States National Guard.  Nationwide, the Army National Guard comprises approximately one half of the US Army's available combat forces and approximately one third of its support organization.  National coordination of various state National Guard units are maintained through the National Guard Bureau.

Montana Army National Guard units are trained and equipped as part of the United States Army.  The same ranks and insignia are used and National Guardsmen are eligible to receive all United States military awards. The Montana Guard also bestows a number of state awards for local services rendered in or to the state of Montana.

The Montana Army National Guard maintains facilities in 28 communities.

History

The Montana Army National Guard was originally formed in 1867. The 163d Infantry dates its history to independent companies grouped together around 1900.  The Militia Act of 1903 organized the various state militias into the present National Guard system.

The 163rd Infantry Regiment of the Montana Guard formed part of the 41st Infantry Division, which fought through the Pacific during World War II. The Regiment was inducted into the Regular Army in September 1940, and were sent to Camp Murray at Fort Lewis, Washington. They participated in large-scale military exercises in California in 1941. On 7 Dec. 1941 small units were detailed to guard the Washington coastline from Japanese saboteurs. In March 1942 they were sent to Australia. Their engagements included the Battle of Buna-Gona in 1942–1943, the Salamaua-Lae campaign in 1943, Operations Reckless and Persecution and the Battle of Biak in 1944, and the liberation of the Philippines in 1945. In September 1945 the Regiment went ashore at Hiro, Japan as part of the occupation of that country. By this time most of the original Montanan troops had been discharged.

The Montana ARNG maintained the 163rd Armored Cavalry Regiment (whose roots date back to 1884), until 1988. In 1985 its units included the 1/163 Cavalry, the 2/163 Cavalry, the 3/163 Cavalry (based in Texas), an Air Troop, an Attack Helicopter Troop (based in Utah), and the 1063rd Engineer Company. The Montana units of the 163rd Armored Cavalry Regiment were converted and expanded into the 163rd Armored Brigade on 1 September 1988. The 3rd Battalion, 49th Field Artillery of the Wyoming Army National Guard became the brigade direct support artillery battalion. The 163rd Armored Brigade inactivated in 1997 due to budget cuts.

On the disbandment of the 163rd Armored Brigade, the 1st Battalion, 163rd Infantry was reassigned to the 116th Cavalry Brigade headquartered in Idaho. 'Commonly referred to as the Griz Battalion, the 1-163rd at first was designated as a Cavalry Regiment in 1953, named the 163rd Cavalry Regiment. The unit was renamed the 1-163rd Infantry Battalion during the 2006 reorganization of the Montana Army National Guard, and was re-designated as Cavalry once again in 2007, combining mechanized infantry with Abrams tank units.' In the 2006 reorganization, the 1st Battalion, 190th Field Artillery at Billings became the 190th Combat Service Support Battalion.

In April 2010, the 1st Battalion, 163rd Cavalry received mobilization orders and prepared to deploy to the Middle East for the second time in five years.

Units and formations
 95th Troop Command (HQ at Helena)
 495th Combat Sustainment Support Battalion (HQ at Kalispell)
 1889th Regional Support Group (HQ at Butte)
 208th Regiment (Regional Training Institute) (HQ at Helena)
 1st Battalion (General Support), 189th Aviation Regiment (HQ at Helena)
 83rd Civil Support Team (WMD-CST) (HQ at Helena)
 103rd Public Affairs Detachment (HQ at Helena)
 190th Combat Service Support Battalion (HQ at Billings)
 190th Chemical Reconnaissance Detachment (HQ at Helena)
 1941st Contingency Contracting Team (HQ at Helena)
 143rd Military Police Company (HQ at Livingston)
 443rd Signal Company (HQ at Billings)
 1063rd Support Maintenance Company (HQ at Billings)
 Detachment 1 at Dillon
 639th Quartermaster Supply Company (HQ at Havre)
 Detachment 1 at Libby
 Detachment 2 at Kalispell
1st Battalion, 163rd Cavalry Regiment
 Headquarters and Headquarters Company at Belgrade
 Company A at Billings
 Detachment 1 at Belgrade
 Company B at Missoula
 Detachment 1 at Kalispell
 Company C at Great Falls
 Company I at Helena
 Detachment 1 at Livingston
 230th Vertical Engineering Platoon at Anaconda
 1049th Engineer Detachment (HQ at Helena)
 484th Military Police Company at Malta
 Detachment 1 at Glasgow
 Detachment 2 at Billings
 260th Engineer Support Company (HQ at Miles City)
 Detachment at Culbertson

Duties

National Guard units can be mobilized at any time by presidential order to supplement regular armed forces, and upon declaration of a state of emergency by the governor of the state in which they serve. Unlike Army Reserve members, National Guard members cannot be mobilized individually (except through voluntary transfers and Temporary Duty Assignments TDY), but only as part of their respective units. However, there has been a significant number of individual activations to support military operations (2001-?); the legality of this policy is a major issue within the National Guard.

Active duty callups

For much of the final decades of the twentieth century, National Guard personnel typically served "One weekend a month, two weeks a year", with a portion working for the Guard in a full-time capacity.  The current forces formation plans of the US Army call for the typical National Guard unit (or National Guardsman) to serve one year of active duty for every three years of service.  More specifically, current Department of Defense policy is that no Guardsman will be involuntarily activated for a total of more than 24 months (cumulative) in one six-year enlistment period (this policy is due to change 1 August 2007, the new policy states that soldiers will be given 24 months between deployments of no more than 24 months, individual states have differing policies).

See also
 Mayhew Foster

References

External links
Bibliography of Montana Army National Guard History compiled by the United States Army Center of Military History
Montana Army National Guard, accessed 25 Nov 2006
GlobalSecurity.org Montana Army National Guard, accessed 25 Nov 2006
Official website

United States Army National Guard by state
Military in Montana